The 54th Utah State Legislature was elected Tuesday, November 7, 2000 and convened on Monday, January 15, 2001.

Utah State Senate

Committees

See List of 54th Utah State Legislature Committees

Make-up

Members

Utah House of Representatives

Committees

See List of 54th Utah State Legislature Committees

Make-up

Members

References 

Legislature
54
2000s in Utah
2001 in Utah
2002 in Utah
2001 U.S. legislative sessions
2002 U.S. legislative sessions